The Jakobstad - Pietarsaari Museum is a city museum in Jakobstad, Finland. It was founded in 1904, but served as a private museum until 1906. The museum is a historic museum, which focuses on maritime and ship building. The main building of the museum is called Malmska gården.

External links
The Jakobstad - Pietarsaari Museum

Jakobstad
Maritime museums in Finland
Museums in Ostrobothnia (region)